Uru is a 2017 Tamil-language psychological thriller slasher film written and directed by Vicky Anand and Produced by V.P. Viji. The film stars Kalaiyarasan, Dhansika, and Mime Gopi. The soundtrack was composed by Johan Shevanesh with cinematography by Prasanna S. Kumar and editing by San Lokesh. It is inspired by the Hollywood films The Shining, Secret Window and Hush. The film released in India on 16 June 2017.

Synopsis
Jeevan, a famous fiction author, is distressed after his stories become outdated. To write a thriller, he visits a hill station where unexpectedly he gets entangled in a series of horrific events.

Cast 
Kalaiyarasan as Jeevan
Dhansika as Jeni/Nisha
Mime Gopi as Thomas
Daniel Annie Pope as Hospital patient
Supergood Subramani

Production 
From a fashion designing background, new Director Vicky Anand stated that he was inspired by Quentin Tarantino to make films, and had previously assisted director Kalyaan during the making of Kaathadi, before announcing Uru as his debut in November 2016. He revealed that the film is a thriller set in a forest and Kalaiyarasan was signed to play a novel writer, while Dhansika would play the female lead role. The technical crew was revealed to feature Johan Shevanesh as the music director, Prasanna S Kumar as the cinematographer. V.P. Viji as the Producer. Furthermore, Drums Sivamani contributed to the film's title track. The film began production in Kodaikanal during early December 2016.

Reception 
Baradwaj Rangan called it "A pretty entertaining thriller that asks us to make up our own minds".

References

External links 
 

2017 films
2017 horror thriller films
2010s Tamil-language films
2017 horror films
Indian horror thriller films
2017 directorial debut films
Indian psychological horror films